Marie Joseph Adrien Fauchier-Magnan (19 November 1873 – 6 August 1963) was a French tennis player. He competed in the men's doubles event at the 1900 Summer Olympics.

References

External links
 

1873 births
1963 deaths
French male tennis players
Olympic tennis players of France
Tennis players at the 1900 Summer Olympics
Tennis players from Paris